Miklós Soltész (born 23 July 1963) is a Hungarian plant engineer and politician, who served as Secretary of State for Social and Family Affairs in the Second Orbán Government between 2010 and 2014. He is the current Secretary of State for Churches, Minorities and Civil Affairs since 2014 in the Third Orbán Government. He is also Member of Parliament (MP) since 2002, representing the Christian Democratic People's Party (KDNP).

References

1963 births
Living people
Engineers from Budapest
Christian Democratic People's Party (Hungary) politicians
Members of the National Assembly of Hungary (2002–2006)
Members of the National Assembly of Hungary (2006–2010)
Members of the National Assembly of Hungary (2010–2014)
Members of the National Assembly of Hungary (2014–2018)
Members of the National Assembly of Hungary (2018–2022)
Members of the National Assembly of Hungary (2022–2026)
Politicians from Budapest